Courtallam is a panchayat town situated at a mean elevation of  in the foothills of the Western Ghats in Tenkasi district of Tamil Nadu, India.  The Coutrallam Falls on the Chittar River is a major tourist attraction.

Demographics
 India census, Courtallam had a population of 2,368.  Males constitute 41% of the population and females 59%. Courtallam has an average literacy rate of 75%, higher than the national average of 59.5%: male literacy is 78% and, female literacy is 74%. 7% of the population is under 6 years of age.

Location
Located in the Western Ghats, Courtallam is part of the Agasthiamalai range, the mountain bearing the name of sage Agastya who is believed to have lived in the area. The closest airports are Tuticorin Airport and Trivandrum International Airport.

Climate

Places of Interest
Courtallam Falls is located near the town. 

The Kutralanatha swamy temple is the location of Chitra Sabha, one of the five sabhas of Nataraja, a form of Lord Shiva. Pancha Sabhai Sthalangal refers to the temples of Nataraja, a form of the Hindu god Shiva where he performed the Cosmic Dance Tandava. The temple at the foot of the hill is conch-shaped which has special significance in Hindu tradition. Tamil poet Thirukudarasappa Kavirayar sang about the beauty of this place in his "Kutraala Kuravanji". Kurumpalaveesar, sung in Tevaram was done by Sambandar. It is one of the shrines of the 275 Paadal Petra Sthalams.

In popular culture
Owing to its scenic beauty, Courtallam has featured in many films.
Papanasam (2015) by Kamal Haasan
Poova Thalaya (1969)
 Aravaan (2012)
 Vettai (2012)
 Mirchi (film) (2013)
 Seethamma Vakitlo Sirimalle Chettu (2013)
 Suvadugal (2013)
 Anjala (film) (2014)
Dharma Durai (2016)
Etharkkum Thunindhavan (2022)

References

Cities and towns in Tenkasi district
Waterfalls of Tamil Nadu
Tourism in Tamil Nadu
Populated places in the Western Ghats